Floyd may refer to:

As a name
 Floyd (given name), a list of people and fictional characters
 Floyd (surname), a list of people and fictional characters

Places in the United States
 Floyd, Arkansas, an unincorporated community
 Floyd, Iowa, a city in Floyd County
 Floyd, Ray County, Missouri, an unincorporated community
 Floyd, Washington County, Missouri, an unincorporated community
 Floyd, New Mexico, a village
 Floyd, New York, a town
 Floyd, Texas, an unincorporated community
 Floyd, Virginia, a town in Floyd County
 Floyd County (disambiguation)
 Floyd River, Iowa, a tributary of the Missouri River 
 Floyd Township (disambiguation)
 Camp Floyd / Stagecoach Inn State Park and Museum, a short-lived U.S. Army post near Fairfield, Utah
 Floyd's Bluff, a hill near Sioux City, Iowa

Storms 
 Hurricane Floyd, major hurricane of 1999
 Tropical Storm Floyd (disambiguation), for other storms named Floyd

Sports 
 Floyd (horse), a National Hunt racehorse
 Floyd of Rosedale, bronze trophy awarded to the winner of each college football game between Iowa and Minnesota

Arts and entertainment 
 "Floyd" (30 Rock), a 2010 episode of the sitcom 30 Rock
 "Floyd", a guitar used by Green Day guitarist Billie Joe Armstrong
 "Floyd", a song by Lynyrd Skynyrd from the album God & Guns, 2009
 "Floyd", a song by Kelis from Food, 2014
 Floyd: Es gibt noch Helden, German title of the 1997 video game Feeble Files by Adventure Soft
 Pink Floyd, an English progressive rock band

Other uses 
 Floyd baronets, a title in the Baronetage of the United Kingdom
 Eurogate Rail Hungary, formerly Floyd Zrt, a Hungarian private railway company
 George Floyd protests, a series of 2020 protests after the murder of George Floyd during a police encounter

See also 
 Floyd-Jones, several people of that name
 Lloyd (disambiguation)
 George Floyd